Perri Peltz  is an Emmy-winning documentary filmmaker, journalist and public health advocate. Most recently, Perri created the documentary news series Axios on HBO with Matthew O’Neill. Perri & Matthew also co-directed and produced the 2019 HBO Documentary, Alternate Endings: Six New Ways to Die in America. Previously, Perri directed the HBO documentary, Warning: This Drug May Kill You, about the opioid addiction epidemic. She produced the HBO documentary Risky Drinking and co-directed A Conversation About Growing Up Black as part of the “Conversation on Race” series for The New York Times Op-Docs. Other films include HBO’s Remembering the Artist: Robert De Niro, Sr. and Prison Dogs. Perri hosts “The Perri Peltz Show” on SiriusXM and is a doctoral candidate at Columbia University's School of Public Health. She was previously an award-winning broadcast journalist for NBC, ABC,and CNN.

Career 

Peltz worked at WNBC from 1987 to 1996 where she co-anchored Weekend Today in New York with Ken Taylor, and weekend editions of News 4 New York at 6 and 11 with Ralph Penza.

Peltz joined Dateline NBC for two years. During that period, she often anchored live news coverage on NBC's 24-hour cable news television channel MSNBC.

She then worked for ABC's 20/20 for two years until she moved to CNN where she stayed until 2002.

Peltz left CNN to produce a feature film, Knights of the South Bronx starring Ted Danson. The film was based on the real-life story of a middle school chess team from the South Bronx that became national chess champions. The film aired on the A&E Network.

Peltz then went to work for the Robin Hood Foundation in New York City. Robin Hood is a non-profit organization dedicated to fighting poverty. While at Robin Hood, Peltz wanted to tell the stories of the people who were working on the front lines in the war against poverty.

In 2005 she rejoined WNBC after a nine-year absence to co-anchor Live at Five with Sue Simmons.  She returned to WNBC to report on those people and the differences they were making. She also anchored Live at Five with Sue Simmons from 31 May 2005, until 12 March 2007, when she began hosting her own half-hour lifestyle broadcast titled News 4 You. The program was part of WNBC's attempt to boost ratings and features stories from the consumer, health and entertainment worlds.

On 10 September 2007, WNBC cancelled News 4 You. Peltz continued to report both for WNBC and for NBC Network on people who were making a difference.

Peltz co-produced and co-directed the documentary Prison Dogs, which premiered at the 2016 Tribeca Film Festival.

Education 
Peltz graduated from The Dalton School in New York City, and then went to Brown University and then to Columbia for a Masters in Public Health. In 2008, she left WNBC to attend medical school.

Charitable work

References

External links
WNBC: Perri Peltz Returns To WNBC As Co-Anchor, Live At Five

1961 births
Living people
American television reporters and correspondents
Television anchors from New York City
New York (state) television reporters
American documentary film directors
American documentary film producers
Film producers from New York (state)